In November 1975, Comoros became the 143rd member of the United Nations. The new nation was defined as consisting of the entire archipelago, despite the fact that France maintains control over Mayotte.

Overview 
Comoros also is a member of the African Union, the Arab League, the European Development Fund, the World Bank, the International Monetary Fund, the Indian Ocean Commission, and the African Development Bank.

The government fostered close relationships with the more conservative (and oil-rich) Arab states, such as Saudi Arabia and Kuwait. It frequently received aid from those countries and the regional financial institutions they influenced, such as the Arab Bank for Economic Development in Africa and the Arab Fund for Economic and Social Development. In October 1993, Comoros joined the League of Arab States, after having been rejected when it applied for membership initially in 1977.

Regional relations generally were good. In 1985 Madagascar, Mauritius, and Seychelles agreed to admit Comoros as the fourth member of the Indian Ocean Commission (IOC), an organization established in 1982 to encourage regional cooperation. In 1993 Mauritius and Seychelles had two of the five embassies in Moroni, and Mauritius and Madagascar were connected to the republic by regularly scheduled commercial flights.

In November 1975, Comoros became the 143d member of the UN. In the 1990s, the republic continued to represent Mahoré in the UN. Comoros was also a member of the OAU, the EDF, the World Bank, the IMF, the IOC, and the African Development Bank.

Comoros thus cultivated relations with various nations, both East and West, seeking to increase trade and obtain financial assistance. In 1994, however, it was increasingly facing the need to control its expenditures and reorganize its economy so that it would be viewed as a sounder recipient of investment. Comoros also confronted domestically the problem of the degree of democracy the government was prepared to grant to its citizens, a consideration that related to its standing in the world community.

Bilateral relations

See also 
 List of diplomatic missions in Comoros
 List of diplomatic missions of Comoros

References